Vașcău is a town in Bihor County, Crișana, Romania. It administers five villages: Câmp (Vaskohmező), Câmp-Moți, Colești (Kolafalva), Vărzarii de Jos (Alsófüves) and Vărzarii de Sus (Felsőfüves).

Demographics

According to the last census from 2011 there were 2,315 people living within the town.

Of this population, 96.63% are ethnic Romanians and 1.8% others.

See also
Tăul lui Ghib

References

Populated places in Bihor County
Localities in Crișana
Towns in Romania
Monotowns in Romania